Austin Collier (24 July 1914 – May 1991) was an English professional footballer who played as a half-back in the Football League for Mansfield Town, York City, Rochdale and Halifax Town, in the Scottish Football League for Queen of the South, in non-League football for Upton Colliery, Frickley Colliery, Goole Town and Scarborough, and was on the books of Partick Thistle, Celtic, Third Lanark and Hibernian without making a league appearance. He later served as assistant manager at Halifax Town.

References

1914 births
1991 deaths
Association football midfielders
Celtic F.C. wartime guest players
English Football League players
English footballers
Footballers from Dewsbury
Frickley Athletic F.C. players
Goole Town F.C. players
Halifax Town A.F.C. players
Hibernian F.C. wartime guest players
Mansfield Town F.C. players
Partick Thistle F.C. wartime guest players
Queen of the South F.C. players
Rochdale A.F.C. players
Scarborough F.C. players
Scottish Football League players
Third Lanark A.C. wartime guest players
Upton Colliery F.C. players
York City F.C. players